İrem Korkmaz (born 31 August 1998) is a Turkish judoka who competes in international judo competitions. She is a European Junior champion, Islamic Solidarity Games champion, World Cadets bronze medalist and Mediterranean Games bronze medalist. She has also won the Turkish national championships six times.

Korkmaz narrowly missed a place for the 2020 Summer Olympics when she lost in the second round of the 2021 World Judo Championships to eventual bronze medalist Fabienne Kocher.

References

External links
 

1998 births
Living people
Sportspeople from Balıkesir
Turkish female judoka
Mediterranean Games bronze medalists for Turkey
Mediterranean Games medalists in judo
Competitors at the 2018 Mediterranean Games
Islamic Solidarity Games medalists in judo
Islamic Solidarity Games competitors for Turkey
21st-century Turkish women